End-to-end or End to End may refer to:

 End-to-end auditable voting systems, a voting system
 End-to-end delay, the time for a packet to be transmitted across a network from source to destination
 End-to-end encryption, a cryptographic paradigm involving uninterrupted protection of data traveling between two communicating parties
 End-to-end data integrity
 End-to-end principle, a principal design element of the Internet
 End-to-end reinforcement learning
 End-to-end vector, points from one end of a polymer to the other end
 Land's End to John o' Groats, the journey from "End to End" across Great Britain
End-to-end testing (see also: Verification and validation)

See also
 E2E (disambiguation)
 Point-to-point (telecommunications)